Harvey Murray Glatman (December 10, 1927 – September 18, 1959) was an American serial killer active during the late 1950s. He was known in the media as the Lonely Hearts Killer and the Glamour Girl Slayer. He would use several pseudonyms, posing as a professional photographer to lure his victims with the promise of a modeling career.

Early life
Harvey Glatman was born on December 10, 1927, in The Bronx, New York City and moved to Colorado early in his childhood. Glatman exhibited antisocial and sadomasochistic tendencies as a small child, tying a string around his penis and pulling on it to achieve a sexual thrill. When he was aged 12, he developed the habit of placing a rope around his neck, running it through the bathtub drain, and pulling it tight against his neck. Glatman's mother took him to the family physician, who said he "would grow out of it."

As a teenager, Glatman began breaking into women's apartments and stealing random items, including lingerie and, in one incident, a handgun. Over time, he escalated to stalking women and sexually assaulting them. In August 1945, Glatman was convicted of kidnapping and sexually assaulting a woman, and was sentenced to 5–10 years in Elmira Reformatory. Two years later, he was transferred to Sing Sing to serve out the rest of his sentence. During his imprisonment, Glatman was diagnosed with "psychopathic personality - schizophrenic type having sexually perverted impulses as the basis of his criminality". He was paroled in 1948.

Murders
Glatman moved to Los Angeles, California, in 1957 and started trolling modeling agencies looking for potential victims. He would contact them with offers of work for pulp magazines, take them back to his apartment, tie them up and sexually assault them, taking pictures all the while. He would then strangle them and dump the bodies in the desert. Glatman's two known model victims were Judith Dull and Ruth Mercado. He met his third victim, Shirley Ann Bridgeford, through a Lonely Hearts ad in the newspaper.

Glatman is also a suspect in the slaying of "Boulder Jane Doe," a victim whose corpse was discovered by hikers near Boulder, Colorado, in 1954. Her identity remained a mystery for 55 years. In October 2009, local authorities were notified by Dr. Terry Melton of Mitotyping Technologies in State College, Pennsylvania, that her lab had made a match between the Jane Doe's DNA profile and that of a woman who thought the unidentified murder victim might be her long-lost sister. The positive identification of "Boulder Jane Doe" was an 18-year-old woman from Phoenix, Arizona, named Dorothy Gay Howard.

Arrest and execution
Glatman was arrested in 1958, caught in the act of kidnapping what would have been his fourth known murder victim, Lorraine Vigil. A patrolman saw him struggling with a woman at the side of the road and arrested him. He confessed to three murders and eventually led the police to a toolbox containing pictures he had taken of his victims.

Glatman was found guilty of two counts of first-degree murder and sentenced to death. He appeared to accept the sentence, even specifically asking the warden to do nothing to save his life. He was executed in the gas chamber of San Quentin State Prison on September 18, 1959.

Media
 Parts of Glatman's career were fictionalized by Jack Webb in 1966 for the two-hour television movie Dragnet, starring his character Sgt. Joe Friday. The film convinced NBC executives to relaunch Dragnet as a TV series in 1967 for a four-year run, although the movie itself was not aired until 1969. Some of the dialogue was reportedly drawn from Glatman's own statements to police, for example:
Suspect (played by Vic Perrin): "The reason I killed those girls was 'cause they asked me to. (pause) They did; all of them."
Sgt. Friday: "They asked you to?"
Suspect: "Sure. They said they'd rather be dead than be with me."

LAPD Captain Pierce Brooks, who was involved in Glatman's arrest and interrogation, served as a technical advisor for the film.

 Glatman was referenced by name in Episode 2, Season 2 of the Netflix series Mindhunter.
Glatman's killings are briefly described in James Ellroy's memoir My Dark Places. Glatman confesses to the three known murders, but is cleared of suspicion with regard to the 1958 murder of Ellroy's mother.

See also
 Want ad killers

General:
 List of serial killers in the United States

References

External links
Harvey Glatman – Colorado Timeline
https://web.archive.org/web/20140820061053/http://www.silviapettem.com/Jane%20Doe.html

1927 births
1959 deaths
1945 crimes in the United States
1957 murders in the United States
20th-century American Jews
20th-century executions by California
20th-century executions of American people
American male criminals
American people convicted of kidnapping
American people convicted of robbery
American rapists
Criminals from Los Angeles
Executed American serial killers
Executed people from New York (state)
Male serial killers
People convicted of murder by California
People executed by California by gas chamber
People from the Bronx
People with antisocial personality disorder
People with schizophrenia
Violence against women in the United States